Iokigawa Dam  is a gravity dam located in Kochi Prefecture in Japan. The dam is used for power production. The catchment area of the dam is 86.1 km2. The dam impounds about 11  ha of land when full and can store 887 thousand cubic meters of water. The construction of the dam was started on 1952 and completed in 1954.

See also
List of dams in Japan

References

Dams in Kōchi Prefecture